Varsity College is a primary and secondary school in Varsity Lakes, Queensland, Australia.

History 
Varsity College opened in January 2001, with Julie Grantham as principal and an initial cohort of 354 preschool to Year 3 students. Since then, the school has grown to a two-campus school with an enrolment of more than 3,500 students from Prep to Year 12.

The school has had multiple principals since its opening:

 Julie Grantham (2001–2002)
 Tracey Cashman (2002–2004)
 Mike Kelly (2004–2005)
 Jeff Davis (2005–2015)
 Steven McLuckie (2015–2018)
 Sharon Schultz (2018–present)

Culture 
During the school year, students participate in cross country, track and field, and swimming carnivals. Age champions are awarded for students who excel in these fields.

Varsity College has four sporting houses that are named after Gold Coast beaches. These houses are:

 Rainbow
 Burleigh
 Kirra
 Miami

Popular culture 
The college has appeared in Sea Patrol, and most notably The Sleepover Club.

References

External links
Varsity College website

Public high schools in Queensland
Schools on the Gold Coast, Queensland
Educational institutions established in 2001
Varsity Lakes, Queensland
2001 establishments in Australia